Jon Gilbert is a freelance British journalist.

Gilbert has worked for 5 News, London Today/Tonight and the national ITV News, as a relief newscaster on the ITV News at 5:30.

See also
History of journalism in the United Kingdom

References

External links

British television presenters
ITN newsreaders and journalists
Living people
Year of birth missing (living people)
Place of birth missing (living people)